The Legion of Super-Heroes is a fictional superhero team appearing in American comic books published by DC Comics.

Initially, the team was closely associated with the original Superboy character (Superman when he was a teenager), and was portrayed as a group of time travelers. Later, the Legion's origin and back story were fleshed out, and the group was given its own monthly comic. Eventually, Superboy was removed from the team altogether and appeared only as an occasional guest star.

The team has undergone two major reboots during its run. The original version was replaced with a new rebooted version following the events of the "Zero Hour" storyline in 1994 and another rebooted team was introduced in 2004. A fourth version of the team, nearly identical to the original version, was introduced in 2007. In 2019, DC announced a new series written by Brian Michael Bendis and drawn by Ryan Sook.

Publication history

Original continuity (1958–1994)

Superboy was the featured series in Adventure Comics in the 1950s. In Adventure Comics #247 (April 1958) by writer Otto Binder and artist Al Plastino, Superboy met three teenagers from the 30th century: Lightning Boy, Saturn Girl, and Cosmic Boy, who were members of a "super-hero club" called the Legion of Super-Heroes. Their club had been formed with Superboy as an inspiration, and they had time travelled to recruit Superboy as a member. After a series of tests, Superboy was awarded membership and returned to his own time.

Although intended as a one-off story focusing on Superboy, the Legion proved so popular that it returned for an encore in Adventure Comics #267 (December 1959). In this story, Lightning Boy had been renamed Lightning Lad, and their costumes were very close to those they wore throughout the Silver Age of Comic Books. The Legion's popularity grew, and they appeared in further stories in Adventure Comics, Action Comics, and other titles edited by Mort Weisinger over the next few years. The ranks of the Legion, only hinted at in those first two stories, was filled with new heroes such as Chameleon Boy, Invisible Kid, Colossal Boy, Star Boy, Brainiac 5, Triplicate Girl, Shrinking Violet, Sun Boy, Bouncing Boy, Phantom Girl, and Ultra Boy. Even the 20th-century cousin to Superman, Supergirl, was recruited as a member.

In Adventure Comics #300 (September 1962), the Legion received their own regular feature, cover-billed "Superboy in 'Tales of the Legion of Super-Heroes'". While they would share space with Superboy solo stories for a couple of years, they eventually displaced Superboy from the title entirely as their popularity grew. Lightning Lad was killed in Adventure Comics #304 (January 1963) and revived in issue #312 (September 1963).

It was the Adventure Comics run which established the Legion's general workings and environment. A club of teenagers, they operated out of a clubhouse in the shape of an inverted yellow rocket ship which looked as if it had been driven into the ground. The position of Legion leader rotated among the membership. Each Legionnaire had to possess one natural superpower which no other member possessed; despite this, several members had overlapping powers, particularly Superboy, Supergirl, Mon-El, and Ultra Boy. Some issues included comical moments where candidates with bizarre, useless, or dangerous abilities would try out for membership and be rejected; five of these flawed candidates went on to form the Legion of Substitute Heroes. The Legion was based on Earth and protected an organization of humans and aliens called the United Planets alongside the regular police the Science Police. The setting for each story was 1000 years from the date of publication.

In Adventure Comics #346 (July 1966), Jim Shooter, 14 years old at the time, wrote his first Legion story. Soon thereafter, Shooter became the regular writer of the Legion stories, with Curt Swan, and later Win Mortimer, as artist. Shooter wrote the story in which Ferro Lad died—the first "real" death of a Legionnaire (although Lightning Lad had been believed dead for a while before)—and introduced many other enduring concepts, including the Fatal Five, Karate Kid, Princess Projectra, Shadow Lass, the Dark Circle, Mordru and the "Adult Legion", a conjecture regarding what the Legionnaires would be like when they grew up.

The Legion's last appearance in Adventure Comics was #380 (May 1969), and they were displaced by Supergirl in the next issue. The early 1970s saw the Legion relegated to the status of back-up feature. First, the team's stories were moved to Action Comics for issues #377–392 (June 1969 – September 1970). Following Mort Weisinger's retirement from DC, the Legion was passed to the oversight of editor Murray Boltinoff and began appearing occasionally as a backup in Superboy, starting with #172 (March 1971), with writers E. Nelson Bridwell and Cary Bates and artist George Tuska. Dave Cockrum began drawing the series with Superboy #184 (April 1972), again increasing the team's popularity.

Superboy and their own title

The first comic book published under the title Legion of Super-Heroes was a four-issue series published in 1973 that reprinted Legion tales from Adventure Comics. In the same year, the Legion returned to cover billing on a book when Superboy became Superboy starring the Legion of Super-Heroes with #197 (August 1973). Crafted by Bates and Cockrum, the feature proved popular and saw such events as the wedding of Bouncing Boy and Duo Damsel in Superboy #200 (Feb 1974). Issues #202 (June 1974) and #205 (Dec. 1974) of the series were in the 100 Page Super Spectacular format. Cockrum was replaced on art by Mike Grell as of issue #203 (August 1974) which featured the death of Invisible Kid. With #231 (September 1977), the book's title officially changed to Superboy and the Legion of Super-Heroes and also became a "giant-size" title. At this point, the book was written by longtime fan Paul Levitz and drawn by James Sherman, although Gerry Conway frequently wrote as well. Saturn Girl and Lightning Lad were married in All-New Collectors' Edition #C-55 (1978), a treasury-sized special written by Levitz and drawn by Grell. In #241–245 (July–December 1978) Levitz and Sherman (and then Joe Staton) produced what was at that time the most ambitious Legion storyline: "Earthwar", a galactic war between the United Planets and the Khunds, with several other villains lurking in the background. During this period, Karate Kid was spun off into his own 20th century-based self-titled series, which lasted 15 issues. Levitz left the book, to be replaced full-time by Gerry Conway.

Superboy departed from the Legion due to a villain's plot, and the book was renamed simply The Legion of Super-Heroes starting with issue #259 (January 1980). Editor Jack C. Harris hired Steve Ditko as guest artist on several issues, a decision which garnered a mixed reaction from the title's readership. Jimmy Janes became the regular artist in a lengthy tale by Conway (and later Roy Thomas) involving Ultra Boy's disappearance during a mission, and his long odyssey to rejoin the team. This story told the tale of the Legionnaire Reflecto (only glimpsed during the "Adult Legion" stories in Adventure Comics), featured villainy by the Time Trapper and Grimbor the Chainsman, and saw Superboy rejoin the team.

Paul Levitz era
Paul Levitz returned to write the series with #284. Pat Broderick and Bruce Patterson illustrated the title for a short time before Keith Giffen began on pencils, with Patterson, and then Larry Mahlstedt, on inks. The creative team received increased popularity following "The Great Darkness Saga", which ran from #287; #290–294; and Annual #3, featuring a full assault on the United Planets by Darkseid. Comics historian Les Daniels observed that, "Working with artist Keith Giffen, Levitz completed the transformation of Legion into a science-fiction saga of considerable scope and depth."

The Legion celebrated issue #300 (June 1983) by revisiting the "Adult Legion" storyline through a series of parallel world short stories illustrated by a number of popular Legion artists from previous years. The story served to free up Legion continuity from following the "Adult Legion" edict of previous issues.

Giffen's style changed abruptly a few issues later, to a darker and sketchier style inspired by Argentinian artist José Muñoz. A new Legion of Super-Heroes comic (the third publication under the title) was launched in August 1984. It used a new "deluxe" printing format utilizing Baxter paper instead of the cheaper newsprint that classic comics had always been printed on. The existing Legion series, still on newsprint, and renamed Tales of the Legion of Super-Heroes with issue #314, continued running new material for a year, then began reprinting stories from the new Legion of Super-Heroes with issue #326. Tales continued publishing reprints until its final issue, #354 (December 1987).

The new series was launched in August 1984, with a five-part story featuring the Legion of Super-Villains. Giffen left in the middle of the story and was replaced by Steve Lightle, who stayed on the book for a year. The debut story arc saw the death of Karate Kid in issue #4 (November 1984). Levitz and Lightle co-created two Legionnaires, Tellus and Quislet, whose unusual appearances contrasted with the humanoid appearances of the other Legionnaires. Greg LaRocque began a lengthy run in #16 (November 1985), including a crossover with John Byrne's recently rebooted Superman titles in #37 and #38. The crossover was the first of several attempts by DC editors to explain the origins and fate of Superboy and his history with the Legion, in light of the revisions to the DC Universe caused by Crisis on Infinite Earths that removed Superman's career as Superboy from his personal history. In the crossover, the Legion's Superboy was revealed to have come from a parallel "pocket universe" created by the Time Trapper. The crossover ended with Superboy's death. Levitz's run ended with the return of Giffen and a four-part story "The Magic Wars", concluding in #63 (August 1989).

"Five Years Later"

Giffen took over plotting as well as penciling with the Legion of Super-Heroes volume 4 title which started in November 1989, with scripts by Tom and Mary Bierbaum and assists by Al Gordon.<ref>{{gcdb series|id= 3810|title= Legion of Super-Heroes vol. 4'}}</ref> Five years after the Magic Wars, the United Planets is a darker place and the Legion a distant memory. However, a group of former Legionnaires worked to re-form the Legion in this harsh new universe, in which Earth was ruled by the alien Dominators.

Shortly after this storyline began, the decision was made to retroactively remove Superboy completely from Legion history. Writer Mark Waid stated that "Because of inter-office politics and machinations ... it was decided that there was no Superboy, but we weren't even allowed to reference him at all." This left the question of where the Legion's inspiration came from without the influence of Superboy. The writers' solution was a massive retcon, in which Mon-El served in the role of paragon instead of Superboy, with several more retcons to follow. Issue #5 featured an alternate universe story in which the restructuring took place, and the Time Trapper was replaced in continuity by his onetime underling Glorith.

One major storyline during this period was the discovery of Batch SW6, a group of clones of the early Legion (from their Adventure Comics days), created by the Dominators. Giffen's original conclusion for the storyline was that the clones would eventually have been revealed to be the real Legion, and the ones whose adventures had been chronicled since the 1950s were actually the clones. The adult Legion's secret programming would kick in, forcing them to fight the younger Legion and leading to a fight to the death in which Legionnaires on both teams would die, with the victims’ names being picked at random. Afterwards, the older team would explore the Vega System as a 30th-century version of the Omega Men in a new series while the younger team would act as the main Legion on Earth. Giffen's other conclusion was for several of the younger and older Legionnaires to die while liberating Earth from the Dominion. The older Legion would defend Earth while the younger Legion would act as the last line of defense for the United Planets as the Omega Men.

Instead, a parallel title, Legionnaires, was launched, starring the "SW6" Legion, whose origins were not resolved until the Zero Hour crossover by a different writing team. Legionnaires was lighter in tone than the main Legion book, and was written by the Bierbaums and drawn by Chris Sprouse. Giffen left the book after a storyline which involved the destruction of Earth,Manning "1990s" in Dolan, p. 255: "Writer/artist Keith Giffen was leaving the Legion title, and he was determined to go out with a bang." and the Bierbaums continued writing, overseeing the return of several classic characters. When the Bierbaums left, writer Tom McCraw took over and made a number of changes, such as forcing several Legion members underground, which required them to take on new identities and costumes, and bringing back long-absent Legionnaire Wildfire.

In 1994, DC rebooted the team's continuity. As part of the Zero Hour storyline, the Legion's original continuity came to an end in September 1994 with Legion of Super-Heroes (vol. 4) #61. The "Five Years Later" era of the Legion was not subsequently reprinted by DC Comics until the announcement of a hardcover omnibus collection scheduled for release in 2020, almost 26 years after the conclusion initial storyline.

Rebooted (1994–2004)

Following Zero Hour, a new Legion continuity was created, beginning with a retelling of the origin story starting in Legion of Super-Heroes (vol. 4) #0 and then continued in spin-off sister series Legionnaires #0 (both released in October 1994). Lightning Lad was renamed Live Wire, and after the group's founding, a large number of heroes were added to the roster very quickly. Several members from the previous continuity were given new codenames, and some new heroes were added, including XS (the granddaughter of Barry Allen, the second Flash), Kinetix, and Gates.

While in some ways following the pattern of the original continuity, the new continuity diverged from the old one in several ways: some characters died as they had previously, others did not, and some Legion members spent time in the 20th century where they recruited Ferro. The Legion also started out having to earn the respect of the United Planets, which they did through two well-earned victories: successfully defending Earth from the White Triangle Daxamites, a group of Nazi-style racial purists; and exposing United Planets President Chu as the mastermind behind the Braal-Titan War, the Sun Eater hoax, the formation of the Fatal Five and the brainwashing of future Legionnaire Jan Arrah.

New writers Dan Abnett and Andy Lanning came on board with penciller Olivier Coipel to produce a dark story leading to the near-collapse of the United Planets and the Legion. In the wake of the disaster, a group of Legionnaires disappeared through a spatial rift and the two existing Legion series came to an end. The miniseries Legion Lost (2000–2001) chronicled the difficult journey of these Legionnaires to return home, while the ensuing miniseries Legion Worlds (2001) showed what was happening back in the United Planets during their absence.

A new series, The Legion, was launched in which the Legion was reunited and given a new base and purpose. Written for its first 33 issues by Abnett and Lanning, the series was cancelled with issue 38. The most notable addition to the team during the title's publication was the Post-Crisis Superboy, a 21st-century clone of Superman and Lex Luthor, who had previously been granted honorary membership.

"Threeboot" continuity (2004–2009)

Following a crossover with the Teen Titans in Teen Titans (vol. 3) #16 and the Teen Titans/Legion Special, a new Legion of Super-Heroes series was launched (the so-called "Threeboot" incarnation), written by Mark Waid (who had previously rebooted the title following the events of Zero Hour) and penciled by Barry Kitson. This new series recreated the team from the beginning and used the Boy/Lad/Girl/Lass/Kid codenames, which the previous continuities had moved away from using.

Initial issues of this series reintroduced the characters, and provided new and divergent origins for them. Most characters resemble their previous counterparts in costume and powers, with the most notable exceptions including Chameleon Boy, now called simply Chameleon and depicted as an androgynous creature; Star Boy, who in this version of the Legion is black; Colossal Boy, who is now a giant who shrinks to human size; and Phantom Girl, who exists in two universes at once and has conversations with people in her own dimension while talking to Legionnaires at the same time.

The future universe of this Legion is an emotionally and mentally repressive society which involves human sexuality and contact being kept at arms' length as well as Orwellian surveillance of minors. The Legion's main goal is social reform as well as protecting people and inspiring them with the legends of superheroes of old, even though the team isn't appreciated by government authorities.

The Legion is worshiped by thousands of young people on different worlds, collectively known as the "Legionnaires", who follow the group in a cult-like manner. The Legionnaires based on Earth keep a constant vigil outside Legion headquarters.

Beginning with issue #16, The Legion of Super-Heroes (vol. 5) was retitled Supergirl and the Legion of Super-Heroes with Supergirl traveling to the future and joining the Legion. With issue #31, Tony Bedard replaced Waid as writer. The title reverted to The Legion of Super-Heroes with issue #37 and Jim Shooter became the writer. The series ended with issue #50, in which the script was credited to "Justin Thyme", a pseudonym previously used by uncredited comic book artists.

Post-Infinite Crisis (2007–2011)

The "Lightning Saga" crossover in Justice League of America (vol. 2) #8–10 and Justice Society of America (vol. 3) #5–6 featured the return of the original versions of Star Boy (now called Starman), Dream Girl, Wildfire, Karate Kid, Timber Wolf, Sensor Girl, Dawnstar, and Brainiac 5. Though several differences between the original and Lightning Saga Legions exist, Geoff Johns stated that this incarnation of the Legion shares the same history as the original Legion up to the events of Crisis on Infinite Earths, with Clark Kent having joined the team as the teenage Superboy prior to the start of his career as Superman.

This version of the Legion next appeared in the "Superman and the Legion of Super-Heroes" storyline in Action Comics #858–863. In the year 3008, the Earth's sun has turned red and several failed Legion applicants who were born on Earth have banded together to form the Justice League of Earth under the leadership of Earth-Man after he claims that Superman was a human who gained his powers from "Mother Earth". Earth-Man uses the claim to have Earth secede from the United Planets and ban all aliens from Earth, resulting in several Legionnaires going underground. With the help of Superman, the Legion eventually restores the sun to its normal state, and defeats Earth-Man and the Justice League of Earth just as the United Planets is about to attack the Earth.

This version of the Legion next appeared in the 2008 Final Crisis: Legion of 3 Worlds limited series, written by Johns and drawn by George Pérez. The mini-series features the post-Infinite Crisis Legion and Superman teaming up with the "Reboot" and "Threeboot" incarnations of the Legion to fight Superboy-Prime, the Legion of Super-Villains, and the Time Trapper. It was revealed in the mini-series that the "Reboot" Legion came from Earth-247 (a metafictional homage to the Legion's first appearance in Adventure Comics #247), which was destroyed in Infinite Crisis, and the "Threeboot" Legion came from the reconstructed Earth-Prime. Johns stated that the intent of the mini-series was to validate the existence of all three versions of the team while simultaneously restoring the pre-Crisis Legion's continuity. The incorporation of the three teams into mainstream DC continuity was shown in Action Comics #864 (June 2008). In the story, Batman recounts the Justice League of America and Justice Society of America's battle alongside the original Legion to defeat Mordru, the "Reboot" team's assistance in destroying a Sun-Eater in the 20th century, and his own recent encounter with the "Threeboot" team.

This version of the Legion was featured in the second Adventure Comics series from September 2009 to October 2011, with the feature focusing on the Legion Academy from April 2011 onwards. This Legion played a part in the "Superman: Last Stand of New Krypton" storyline in 2010, where the ongoing continual events of "The Lightning Saga" concluded in its entirety. A new Legion of Super-Heroes ongoing series was published from May 2010 to August 2011, written by Paul Levitz and drawn by Yildiray Cinar, featuring the Retroboot version of the team.

The New 52 (2011–2015)Legion of Super-Heroes was relaunched in September 2011 with issue #1. Simultaneously, DC Comics cancelled Adventure Comics and replaced it with a new volume of Legion Lost. While Legion of Super-Heroes continued the adventures of the team from that title's previous volume, Legion Lost featured Wildfire, Dawnstar, Timber Wolf, Tyroc, Tellus, Gates and Chameleon Girl. The Legion Lost characters are stranded on 21st century Earth during a mission to save the future, and they are forced to remain there after contracting a pathogen that could destroy the 31st century if they returned. The Legion Lost series ended with the time-lost Legionnaires still stranded in the 21st century.

This era of the Legion's publication concluded with issue #23 in August 2013, with the title's cancellation. In the final issue, the United Planets disbanded the Legion after a cataclysmic battle with the Fatal Five, and the individual Legionnaires retired to their homeworlds or the Science Police. The entire Legion was remobilized to battle Infinitus in the six-issue "Infinitus Saga" in Justice League United, written by Jeff Lemire (December 2014 – May 2015). The "Infinitus Saga" featured Brainiac 5 as leader, the return of the Legion Lost team to active Legion status and the inclusion of a number of Legionnaires from other continuities in the Legion's active ranks.

Legion of Super-Heroes (2019)

A new Legion of Super-Heroes series from writer Brian Michael Bendis and artist Ryan Sook was announced by DC Comics in June 2019. A prelude two-part series entitled Legion of Super-Heroes: Millennium was released in September and October, with the ongoing series debuting in November 2019.DC Previews issue #15, (July 2019) The series ended in January 2021 with 12 issues.

Publications

Members

Alternative versions
Alternative versions of the Legion of Super-Heroes have appeared in various DC comic books.

The Legion of Super-Heroes appeared in a single panel in the Kingdom Come miniseries which takes place on Earth-22 in the DC Multiverse. This version of the team appears again briefly, in the closing pages of a story arc detailing the Earth-22 Superman's sojourn with the Justice Society of America in the 21st century (of Earth-0).
In the DC/Marvel combined "Amalgam Universe", a merged version of the Legion, Marvel's Guardians of the Galaxy and characters from Marvel's 2099 reality appeared in the title Spider-Boy Team-Up #1 as the Legion of Galactic Guardians 2099.
An alternative version of the Legion appeared in Legionnaires Annual #1 (1994). The annual, which was part of the 1994 "Elseworlds Annuals" event, featured a version of the Legion based on King Arthur's court.Legion of Super-Heroes Annual #7, part of the 1996 "Legends of Dead Earth" event, showed Wildfire, as the last survivor of the original Legion, forming a new team.
The "DC One Million" event, which featured characters based in the 853rd century, featured twenty-six teams called the Justice Legion. The Justice Legion L is based on the Legion of Super-Heroes, its members devoted to a version of the United Planets that has made a tour of the universe and is headed back toward Earth to "replenish its diversity". Among them are Brainiac 417 (a disembodied intelligence from the merged worlds of Colu and Bgztl), Cosmicbot (a metallic being who commands the world of Braal), the M'onelves (a super-powered collective of miniature beings from the bonded Daxam-Imsk), Titangirl (a living psychic manifestation of the telepaths of Titan), Implicate Girl (loosely inspired by Triplicate Girl, she contains the entire planet Cargg inside her bindi-like third eye and can access any Carggite's skills), as well as an elemental darkness called the Umbra (from Talok VIII) and the Chameleon (a religious fundamentalist from the "Chameleon World," which was once known as Durla). The Justice Legion includes secondary members like the Dreamer (the last precognitive of the dead world Naltor, who has a thoughtscreen in her forehead), the "Wildflame" (the comatose remains of the energy being Wildfire) and Cris Kend (the Superboy of the 843rd century summoned by Brainiac 417 to stop an apocalypse). The story of the Justice Legion L is, in turn, related one thousand years later to three youths known as Dav, Vara and Chec who exist in a techno-agrarian society inside a tesseract on Earth; when hospitalized for displaying possible delusions, they are empowered by Wildfire to become the Legion of the 863rd century.
Legions from several timelines created by the Time Trapper encounter the "Reboot" Legion and fight each other.
An alternative version of the Legion appeared during the "Absolute Power" arc of the Superman/Batman monthly series. Three members of the Legion of Super-Villains, Lightning Lord, Cosmic King and Saturn Queen, go back in time to change the course of history. They are later joined by Beauty Blaze and Echo. In the alternate timeline, they use members of the Legion of Super-Heroes who were either brainwashed or converted to their cause as a way to protect their time bubble. Most of the members of this army are based on the original Legion from the 1970s. The only three who were not among this army were Cosmic Boy, Lightning Lad, and Saturn Girl.
The Elseworlds two-part limited series Superboy's Legion featured an alternative version of the Legion that was formed by Superboy. In the story, the infant Kal-El is stranded in the asteroid belt and remains there, in stasis, until found in 2987 by R. J. Brande, a thousand years after Krypton's destruction. At the age of 14, "Kal Brande", also known as Superboy, joins Cosmic Boy and Saturn Girl in forming "Superboy's Legion", later known as the Legion of Super-Heroes.
In Static #14, part of the Worlds Collide crossover between DC Comics and Milestone Media, the villain Rift combined Metropolis and Dakota, creating a futuristic amalgamation of the two. The combined city was home to a pastiche of the Legion called the League of Super-Teens. Static, Rocket, and Superboy were transformed into Static Lad, Rocket Gal, and Fabulous Boy. Other unseen members, mentioned by name, were Adhesive Lad, Burnrubber, Dough Boy III, Fabulous Man, Fan Boy, Fat Boy, Foxtrot Lass, Frat Boy, Hoot-Man, Itty-Bitty Girl, Kite Lad, Kodak Kid, Mall Hair Girl, Maniac 5, Phenomenal Lass, Procrastination Lad, Seltzer Lad, Sneeze Lad, Sterno Lad, Super Nazi-Fighter, and Very-Big Boy. Superman, Hardware, Icon, Steel, and Transit were also members. This team vanished when Dakota and Metropolis were separated.
In the DC Universe: Legacies mini-series, a young Clark Kent is approached by the Legion of Super-Heroes to join their team and is given a Legion flight ring. However, Legions from multiple points further in the future arrive asking Kent for help, and a fight breaks over which Legion will receive his help first. Kent rebukes the multiple Legions, returns the ring noting that it means something special to each Legionnaire, and tells them to come back when they can tell him what that special thing is.

Parodies and homagesLegion of Super-Heroes Annual #5 (1994) featured the Legion in a parody of The Wizard of Oz.
In DC's New Year's Evil: Mr. Mxyzptlk #1 (1998), Mxyzptlk attempts to recruit a parody of the Legion, called the Logjam of Super-Heroes, from his comic book collection. Despite its many members, the only ones who were properly identified were Batter-Eater Lad, Butler-Eater Lad, Butter-Eater Lad, Button-Eater Lad, and Mutton-Eater Lad (all take-offs on Matter-Eater Lad), Kid Kid, Kid Lass, Loud Kid, Negative Lass, Lightning Lice, and Beachball Boy.
In 1977, X-Men (vol 1) #107 introduced a team of heroes called the Imperial Guard. Many of their members, designed by former Legion artist Dave Cockrum, were based on Legionnaires: Astra (Phantom Girl), Electron (Cosmic Boy), Fang (Timber Wolf), Hobgoblin (Chameleon Boy), Impulse (Wildfire), Magic (Projectra), Mentor (Brainiac 5), Midget (Shrinking Violet), Nightside (Shadow Lass), Quasar (Star Boy), Smasher (Ultra Boy), Starbolt (Sun Boy), Tempest (Lightning Lad) and Titan (Colossal Boy). The team is led by Gladiator (Mon-El and Superman).
The satire series normalman featured a 33rd-century team called the Legion of Superfluous Heroes. In their first appearance, Uranus Girl wants to save normalman, but Lightweight Lad points out they need to do roll call first. The roll call, which includes a seemingly endless list of members, is a recurring gag in the series. When Lightweight Lad loses his place in the roll and is going to start over, he is killed by the other members of the Legion (who also die due to the resulting blast). It is revealed the Legion is in a time loop. 
The Legion of the Stupid Heroes one-shot is a parody of the Legion published by Blackthorne Publishing in 1987.Big Bang Comics #12 features a Legion homage called the Pantheon of Heroes that hails from the 30th century. Its members are Angelfish, Anti-Matter Lad, Brain Boy, Butterfly Queen, Clone Boy, Devil Boy, Dragon Fist, Galactic Lad, Golden Girl, Ghost Girl, Gravity Girl, Jupiter Boy, Kid Warlock, Laughing Boy, Nature Boy, Photon, Snowstar, Tele-Girl, and Ultragirl.SFA Spotlight #5 (May 1999) published by Shanda Fantasy Arts features a Spider-Ham-style parody of the Legion called the Legion of Super-Furries.
In "The Innocents", a story arc that ran in Garth Ennis' series The Boys #40–43, Wee Hughie is sent to monitor the third-rate superhero team Superduper. Billed in-universe as "teenagers from the future," Superduper includes several superheroes whose powers mimic those of the Legion of Super-Heroes, but who are incompetent: Black Hole (a Matter-Eater Lad analog) chokes on a spoon while trying to eat an entire tub of ice cream; Klanker (Ferro Lad) whose attempts to take on his form of iron usually result in him transforming into inanimate objects; and Stool Shadow (Shadow Lass/Phantom Girl), who bumps into walls when trying to phase through them.

In other media
Television
Animation

 Cosmic Boy, Chameleon Boy, and Saturn Girl made an appearance on Superman: The Animated Series in the 1998 episode "New Kids in Town"; the three of them traveled through time to stop Brainiac, who has traveled back in time to kill a teenage Clark Kent. Jason Priestley voiced Chameleon Boy, Melissa Joan Hart voiced Saturn Girl, and Chad Lowe voiced Cosmic Boy. As with pre-Crisis continuity, Superman was the inspiration for the team. This episode also features cameos by other prominent Legionnaires (shown on the right).
 In the 2004 episode of Justice League Unlimited entitled "The Greatest Story Never Told", the Legion's arch-villain Mordru appears. Members of the Justice League battle Mordru in the background, while the narrative follows Booster Gold as he attempts to close a walking black hole while he's supposed to be on "crowd control". The Legion, along with the Fatal Five, later appeared in a 2006 episode of Justice League Unlimited entitled "Far From Home" with Googy Gress as Bouncing Boy and Matt Czuchry as Brainiac 5. Supergirl was taken to the future to help fight the Fatal Five and free the Legion, and decided to stay and join the Legion. The other Legionnaires who appeared in this episode included Blok, Chameleon Boy, Colossal Boy, Cosmic Boy, Lightning Lad, Phantom Girl, Saturn Girl, Shadow Lass, Timber Wolf, Ultra Boy, and Wildfire. All had minor or cameo appearances. 

 The Legion of Super Heroes animated series premiered on Kids' WB! (the Saturday Morning kids' block on The CW) in September 2006. The show's premise is that the Legion travels back in time to recruit Superman in their fight against crime in the 31st century, but they go a little too far back and recruit Superman before he has had a chance to fully develop his powers. Superman, the inspiration for the Legion, now has to learn from them how to be a hero. Season 1 focused on a "core" team consisting of Bouncing Boy, Brainiac 5, Lightning Lad, Phantom Girl, Saturn Girl, Superman, and Timber Wolf, while other Legionnaires such as Cosmic Boy, Colossal Boy, Ferro Lad, Matter-Eater Lad, and Triplicate Girl appeared occasionally. Classic Legion villains such as the Fatal Five, Starfinger, and the Sun-Eater were included, and other Legionnaires, including Blok, Dream Girl, Element Lad, Shrinking Violet, Star Boy, Sun Boy, and Tyroc, made cameo appearances. Season 2 takes place two years after the end of Season 1, with Chameleon Boy joining the team and Superman's clone from the future, Superman X, being introduced.
 Saturn Girl, Phantom Girl and Chameleon Boy appeared in Young Justice. The trio of heroes secretly followed Miss Martian, Superboy and Beast Boy during their trip to Mars, attempting to stop Lor-Zod from assassinating Superboy to save their future. However, they believed to have failed in their mission to save Superboy from the gene-bomb and assume Phantom Girl died in the same explosion. In the aftermath, Saturn Girl and Chameleon Boy are both stuck in the past and attempt to find another way to save their future, but are unaware that both Superboy and Phantom Girl are still alive and are trapped inside the Phantom Zone. They later seek help from Bart Allen and reveal to him the truth about their mission and their next goal; To travel to New Genesis and destroy the Phantom Zone Projector before Lor-Zod can use it to free his imprisoned parents in the past. They are successful in destroying the projector, but in the process discover Superboy and Phantom Girl's survival and are later taken hostage by Lor-Zod and Ma'alefa'ak. They are eventually set free and work together alongside the rest of the heroes to save Superboy and defeat the Zods one and for all. By the end of the season, Saturn Girl, Phantom Girl and Chameleon Boy return to the future when Brainiac 5 appears with a Time Sphere to retrieve them, assuring the timeline has been restored and say their goodbyes to Superboy.
 In December 2021, it was announced that an adult animated series based on the Legion of Super-Heroes was being developed by Brian Michael Bendis for HBO Max.

Live action

 During San Diego Comic-Con International 2008, it was announced that Geoff Johns would be writing an episode of Smallville titled "Legion", which would introduce the Legion of Super-Heroes into the series' continuity. The Legionnaires included were the founding members Cosmic Boy, Saturn Girl and Lightning Lad (portrayed by Ryan Kennedy, Alexz Johnson and Calum Worthy, respectively). The episode aired on January 15, 2009, and featured the three Legionnaires, starting with a brief battle with the Fatal Five villain the Persuader (portrayed by Fraser Aitcheson), and then assisting Clark Kent in his fight against Brainiac. The episode featured Legion flight rings and made mention of future elements of the Legion, including Brainiac 5. Cosmic Boy returns in the episode "Doomsday" to warn Kent of his predestined death at the hands of Doomsday, and to inform him that the Legion is ready to fight the beast if Kent sends him to the 31st century. Kent, however, refuses, claiming that the creature is his responsibility. In Season 10, Episode 4, the show's 200th episode, Brainiac 5 – having been reprogrammed to fight for the Legion – appears to Kent and takes him through his past, present and future as part of his training. He was portrayed by James Marsters.
 In The Flash episode "Welcome to Earth-2", as Barry, Cisco and Wells are traveling to Earth-2, glimpses of the Multiverse are seen, including an image of a Legion flight ring. The footage of the ring was taken from the Supergirl episode "Solitude" (see below), which aired shortly thereafter. In "What's Past is Prologue" the A.I. Gideon states that in the future Nora West-Allen / XS was the Legion's fifth recruit. Phantom Girl will appear in an upcoming episode in season eight.
 A Legion flight ring appears in the Supergirl season one episode "Solitude". It appears as one of the objects inside the Fortress of Solitude, though the reason for the ring being there has yet to be revealed. In the season three episode "Wake up", members of the Legion appear when Supergirl found a ship containing Mon-El, Saturn Girl, Brainiac 5, and several members in stasis pods; with the three aforementioned Legionnaires taking part in the season's events. While he does not appear, Chameleon Boy is also mentioned as a member. In this continuity, Supergirl was the inspiration for the team instead of Superboy. By the season finale, Winn Schott joined the team and traveled with the Legionnaires back to their home time while Brainiac 5 stayed behind in the 21st century. At the start of season four, Nia Nal / Dreamer  is introduced and established as a 21st century ancestor of the Legionnaire Dream Girl. In the season five two-parter, "Back from the Future" Winn returned, revealing he had operated with the Legion as Computer Lad before changing his codename to Toyman in honor of his father after he helped him defeat a villainous version of himself.

Films
 In the 2014 direct-to-video animated film, JLA Adventures: Trapped in Time, Legionnaire trainees Karate Kid and Dawnstar travel to the 21st century and team-up with the Justice League to stop a time-lost Lex Luthor, the Time Trapper, and the Legion of Doom from altering the timeline.
 In 2016, the Legion of Super-Heroes appear in the Lego DC Comics Super Heroes: Justice League – Cosmic Clash direct-to-video film. When Brainiac was changing history and turned Superman into an obedient cyborg, he wiped out the Legion of Super-Heroes leaving Cosmic Boy, Lightning Lad, and Saturn Girl as the only survivors where they managed to form a resistance against Brainiac.
 The Legion appeared in the 2019 animated film Justice League vs. the Fatal Five. Members of the Fatal Five attack the Legion headquarters to steal a Time Sphere. They succeed and escape to the past, with Star Boy following them and in the process losing his medication which keeps his mind stabilized. He eventually meets the Justice League and teams up with them to fight the Fatal Five.
 The Legion appeared in the 2023 animated film Legion of Super-Heroes.

Video games
 Various members of the Legion of Super-Heroes appear as assist characters in Scribblenauts Unmasked: A DC Comics Adventure.
 The Legion of Super-Heroes appear in DC Universe Online. They appear with the game's 39th episode, "Long Live the Legion" that released on November 5, 2020. The hero or villain characters aid the Legion and Teen Titans of present day, in 31st Century Metropolis to defeat Mordru, Emerald Empress, Validus, plus evil and mind controlled versions of the Legionnaires themselves.
 The Legion of Super-Heroes appear in Injustice 2. They are seen in Brainiac's ending where Brainiac 5 posed as Brainiac to defeat him. While they grilled him for going back in time to stop Brainiac, they are pleased that he stopped Brainiac's rampage. In Superman's ending, he recruits a number of heroes from the worlds collected on Brainiac's ship into the Regime.

Miscellaneous
 The Legion from this continuity also had a featured appearance in the Justice League Adventures #28 comic book.
 The Legion from the animated series Legion of Super Heroes appeared in their own comic book series, Legion of Super Heroes in the 31st Century, which lasted 20 issues from 2007 to 2009.
 The complete Legion of Super-Heroes team is featured in the Smallville Season 11 digital comic based on the TV series, in the arc titled Continuity''. The digital issues were later released as a traditional paper comic book and collected in trade paperback format.

See also
Interlac (futuristic in-story language)

References

External links

Legion of Super-Heroes: The Complete Guides
The Legion of Super-Heroes Reference File
Legion of Super-Heroes at Mike's Amazing World of Comics

 
Fiction set in the 30th century
Comics set in the 31st century
1958 comics debuts
Characters created by Otto Binder
Comics by Paul Levitz
Comics characters introduced in 1958
Comics spin-offs
DC Comics titles
Science fiction comics
Superhero comics
Superman characters
Comics about time travel
Space opera comics